Split screen may refer to:

 Split screen (computing), dividing graphics into adjacent parts
 Split screen (video production), the visible division of the screen
 Split Screen (TV series), 1997–2001 
 Split-Screen Level, a bug in the video game Pac-Man at Level 256
 Split screen, a focusing screen in a system camera
 Splitscreen, or Volkswagen Type 2, a light commercial vehicle 1950–1967

See also

Multi-screen (disambiguation)
Dual Screen (disambiguation)

bg:Split screen
de:Split Screen
fr:Split screen